The Embassy of the State of Palestine in Syria is the diplomatic mission of the Palestine in Syria. It is located in Murshid Khater St. in Damascus.

See also

List of diplomatic missions in Syria.
List of diplomatic missions of Palestine.

References

Damascus
Palestine
State of Palestine–Syria relations